Basistemon is a genus of flowering plants belonging to the family Plantaginaceae.

Its native range is Southern America.

Species:

Basistemon argutus 
Basistemon bogotensis 
Basistemon intermedius 
Basistemon klugii 
Basistemon peruvianus 
Basistemon pulchellus 
Basistemon silvaticus 
Basistemon spinosus

References

Plantaginaceae
Plantaginaceae genera